"Lie to Me" is a song by Australian pop rock band 5 Seconds of Summer. It is the third track on the band's third studio album Youngblood, released on 15 June 2018. The song was re-recorded featuring additional vocals by American singer-songwriter Julia Michaels, who also co-wrote the song and was released on 21 December 2018 as the album's fourth and final single. 

An acoustic version was released on 1 February 2019.

Reception
Brooke Bajgrowicz of Billboard said "The new version of 'Lie to Me' has Julia Michaels' soft vocals changing up the narrative. While the original lyrics have the guys broken over a love not lining up, the words in the latest rendition readjust to explore both sides of the relationship."

Daniel Kreps of Rolling Stone described the acoustic version as "a slowed-down, piano-led take" and described the accompanying music video as picturesque.

Music video 
On 25 April 2018 the band send out a tweet that simply said "Lie To Me video." which lead a lot of fans to believe that a music video for the song would soon be released. However, the video wasn't released until 19 January 2019.

The video was directed by Brendan Vaughan and depicts lead singer Luke Hemmings singing the song while sitting in and on a car in the middle of a racetrack. The other band members are seen sitting on the bleachers, watching as two other cars circle, and eventually crash into, the car Hemmings is sitting in. The video ends with shots of the band performing the song together and the car exploding.

Drummer Ashton Irwin explained the symbolism of the video, saying "The lie to me Video represents to me when someone closest to you is in a toxic situation, and they take an emotional beating over and over. With no attempt to escape. It’s absolutely heartbreaking. All you can do is watch."

Track listings

Charts

Weekly charts

Year-end charts

Certifications

Release history

References

2018 singles
2018 songs
5 Seconds of Summer songs
Julia Michaels songs
Songs written by Andrew Watt (record producer)
Songs written by Ashton Irwin
Songs written by Ali Tamposi
Songs written by Calum Hood
Songs written by Julia Michaels
Songs written by Luke Hemmings
Capitol Records singles